Immunoglobulin D (IgD) is an antibody isotype that makes up about 1% of proteins in the plasma membranes of immature B-lymphocytes where it is usually co-expressed with another cell surface antibody called IgM. IgD is also produced in a secreted form that is found in very small amounts in blood serum, representing 0.25% of immunoglobulins in serum. The relative molecular mass and half-life of secreted IgD is 185 kDa and 2.8 days, respectively. Secreted IgD is produced as a monomeric antibody with two heavy chains of the delta (δ) class, and two Ig light chains.

Function
The function of IgD has been a puzzle in immunology since its discovery in 1964. IgD is present in species from cartilaginous fish to humans (with the possible exception of birds). This nearly ubiquitous appearance in species with an adaptive immune system demonstrates that IgD may be as ancient as IgM and suggests that IgD has important immunological functions.

In B cells, the function of IgD is to signal the B cells to be activated. By being activated, B cells are ready to take part in the defense of the body as part of the immune system. During B cell differentiation, IgM is the exclusive isotype expressed by immature B cells. IgD starts to be expressed when the B cell exits the bone marrow to populate peripheral lymphoid tissues. When a B cell reaches its mature state, it co-expresses both IgM and IgD. A 2016 study by Übelhart and colleagues found that IgD signaling is only triggered by repetitive multivalent immunogens, while IgM can be triggered either by soluble monomeric or by multivalent immunogens. Cδ knockout mice (mice that have been genetically altered so that they do not produce IgD) have no major B cell intrinsic defects. IgD may have some role in allergic reactions.

Recently, IgD was found to bind to basophils and mast cells and activate these cells to produce antimicrobial factors to participate in respiratory immune defense in humans. It also stimulates basophils to release B cell homeostatic factors. This is consistent with the reduction in the number of peripheral B cells, reduced serum IgE level and defective primary IgG1 response in IgD knockout mice.

Structural diversity 
IgD has structural diversity throughout evolution of vertebrates because it is a structurally flexible locus to complement the function of IgM. One of the IgD importance is that can substitute the function of IgM in the case of IgM defects. B cells may express IgD by alternative RNA splicing and class switch recombination. Alternative splicing is promoted in all jawed vertebrates but class switch recombination only in higher vertebrates and increase diversification of IgD. In jawed fishes, the structure of the constant region is highly diverse with amplifications of Cδ exons. Different splice variants exists due to alternative splicing. In humans and primates, IgD has three Cδ domains and long H region with an amino-terminal region rich in alanine and threonine residues. C-terminal regions are rich in lysine, glutamate and arginin residues modificated with O-glycosylation for binding a putative IgD receptor on the surface of activated T cells. Human IgD with its H region interacts with heparin and heparan sulphate proteglycans expressed in the basophiles and mast cells. Mouse IgD has a shorter H region and different amino acid composition modified with N-glycosylation.

Method of coexpression
In the human Heavy-Chain Locus, 3' of the V-D-J cassette is a series of C (for constant) genes, each conferring an Ig isotype.
The Cμ (IgM) gene is 3' and closest to the V-D-J cassette, with the Cδ gene appearing 3' to Cμ.

A primary mRNA transcript will contain the transcribed V-D-J cassette, and the Cμ and Cδ genes, with introns in between them.

Alternative splicing can then occur, causing a selection of either Cμ or Cδ to appear on the functional mRNA (μ mRNA and δ mRNA respectively). Alternative splicing is thought to be possible due to two polyadenylation sites, one appearing between the Cμ and Cδ, and the other 3' of Cδ (polyadenylation in the latter site would cause Cμ to be spliced away along with the intron). The precise mechanism of how the polyadenylation site is chosen remains unclear.

The resulting functional mRNA will have the V-D-J and C regions contiguous, and its translation will generate either a μ heavy chain or δ heavy chain. The heavy chains then couple with either κ or λ light chains to create the final IgM or IgD antibody.

Zinc finger protein 318 (ZNF318) has a role in the promotion of IgD expression and controlling the alternative splicing of the long pre-mRNA. In immature B cells that mainly express the μ transcript, there is no ZFP318 expression, but in mature B cells with dual IgM and IgD expression, both δ and μ transcript is made and ZFP318 is expressed. Enders et al. (2014) found in mice that null mutations in ZFP318 resulted in no IgD expression.

Activation of immune system via IgD 
Innate and adaptive Immune responses can be activated via membrane-anchored IgD that functions as a part of B-cell receptor (BCR) complexes or secreted IgD that bounds to monocytes, mast cells, and basophil,.  Counter-intuitive to the contemporary dogmas that suggest these activated immune responses via IgD expression can potentiate autoimmune diseases and allergic inflammation, a 2010 study by Nguyen TG et al. has first demonstrated that treatments with a B-cell activating monoclonal anti-IgD antibody can attenuate disease severity in an animal model of collagen-induced arthritis. This novel therapeutic effect by anti-IgD antibody treatment was later confirmed in mouse models of epidermolysis bullosa acquisita and in chronic contact hypersensitivity. Studies have shown that levels of secreted lgD are usually elevated in patients with an autoimmune disease, and recently it has been demonstrated that IgD enhanced the activation of peripheral blood mononuclear cells in Rheumatoid Arthritis (RA) patients leading to the hypothesis that IgD could be an immunotherapeutic target for the management of RA. Activated immune responses via IgD-BCR and secreted IgD may exert suppressive effects on autoimmune diseases and allergic inflammations, suggesting a potential immune regulatory function of IgD.

References

External links
 

Glycoproteins
Antibodies